Yasnogorsky District  is an administrative district (raion), one of the twenty-three in Tula Oblast, Russia. Within the framework of municipal divisions, it is incorporated as Yasnogorsky Municipal District. It is located in the north of the oblast. Its administrative center is the town of Yasnogorsk. Population: 31,152 (2010 Census);  The population of Yasnogorsk accounts for 53.9% of the district's total population.

References

Notes

Sources

Districts of Tula Oblast